6twenty is the debut album released by New Zealand rock band The D4 in 2001. A limited edition vinyl version was released in 2002.

Track listing
All songs written by the D4, except where noted.
Original 2001 release
"Rock'n'Roll Motherfucker" 2:00
"Party" 2:39
"Come On!" 2:23
"Pirate Love" (Johnny Thunders) 3:39
"Running On Empty" 3:12
"Ladies Man" 3:47
"Invader Ace" (Guitar Wolf) 2:46
"Little Baby" 3:08
"Rebekah" 3:37
"Mysterex" (The Scavengers) 3:56
"Exit To The City" 3:40 
"Heartbreaker" 4:28

2002 Limited Vinyl release
"Rock'n'Roll Motherfucker|RocknRoll Motherf**ker"
"Party"
"Come On!"
"Pirate Love"
"Running On Empty"
"Ladies Man"
"Invader Ace"
"Heartbreaker"
"Get Loose"
"Little Baby"
"Rebekah"
"Mysterex"
"Exit To The City"

2003 US release
"Rock'n'Roll Motherfucker" (Abbreviated "RnR MF" on the back cover)
"Get Loose"
"Party"
"Come On!"
"Invader Ace"
"Exit To The City"
"Heartbreaker"
"Running On Empty"
"Ladies Man"
"Pirate Love"
"Little Baby"
"Rebekah"
"Mysterex"
"Outta Blues"
(Also includes enhanced CD extras, such as the video for "Get Loose")

Personnel
Dion Palmer: Vocals, Guitars
Jimmy Christmas: Vocals, Guitars
Vaughan "Vaughn" Williams: Bass
Daniel "Beaver" Pooley: Drums
With Cameron Rowe: Organ

Production
Produced By The D4, Antonio Fernandez & Bob Frisbee
Engineered By Andrew Buckton, Bob Frisbee & Malcolm Welsford

References

The D4 albums
Flying Nun Records albums
2001 debut albums